In mathematics, a Wieferich pair is a pair of prime numbers p and q that satisfy

pq − 1 ≡ 1 (mod q2) and qp − 1 ≡ 1 (mod p2)

Wieferich pairs are named after German mathematician Arthur Wieferich.
Wieferich pairs play an important role in Preda Mihăilescu's 2002 proof of Mihăilescu's theorem (formerly known as Catalan's conjecture).

Known Wieferich pairs 

There are only 7 Wieferich pairs known:
(2, 1093), (3, 1006003), (5, 1645333507), (5, 188748146801), (83, 4871), (911, 318917), and (2903, 18787).

Wieferich triple 
A Wieferich triple is a triple of prime numbers p, q and r that satisfy

pq − 1 ≡ 1 (mod q2), qr − 1 ≡ 1 (mod r2), and rp − 1 ≡ 1 (mod p2).

There are 17 known Wieferich triples:
(2, 1093, 5), (2, 3511, 73), (3, 11, 71), (3, 1006003, 3188089), (5, 20771, 18043), (5, 20771, 950507), (5, 53471161, 193), (5, 6692367337, 1601), (5, 6692367337, 1699), (5, 188748146801, 8807), (13, 863, 23), (17, 478225523351, 2311), (41, 138200401, 2953), (83, 13691, 821), (199, 1843757, 2251), (431, 2393, 54787), and (1657, 2281, 1667).

Barker sequence 
Barker sequence or Wieferich n-tuple is a generalization of Wieferich pair and Wieferich triple. It is primes (p1, p2, p3, ..., pn) such that

p1p2 − 1 ≡ 1 (mod p22), p2p3 − 1 ≡ 1 (mod p32), p3p4 − 1 ≡ 1 (mod p42), ..., pn−1pn − 1 ≡ 1 (mod pn2), pnp1 − 1 ≡ 1 (mod p12).

For example, (3, 11, 71, 331, 359) is a Barker sequence, or a Wieferich 5-tuple; (5, 188748146801, 453029, 53, 97, 76704103313, 4794006457, 12197, 3049, 41) is a Barker sequence, or a Wieferich 10-tuple.

For the smallest Wieferich n-tuple, see , for the ordered set of all Wieferich tuples, see .

Wieferich sequence 

Wieferich sequence is a special type of Barker sequence. Every integer k>1 has its own Wieferich sequence. To make a Wieferich sequence of an integer k>1, start with a(1)=k, a(n) = the smallest prime p such that a(n-1)p-1 = 1 (mod p) but a(n-1) ≠ 1 or -1 (mod p). It is a conjecture that every integer k>1 has a periodic Wieferich sequence. For example, the Wieferich sequence of 2:

2, 1093, 5, 20771, 18043, 5, 20771, 18043, 5, ..., it gets a cycle: {5, 20771, 18043}. (a Wieferich triple)

The Wieferich sequence of 83:

83, 4871, 83, 4871, 83, 4871, 83, ..., it gets a cycle: {83, 4871}. (a Wieferich pair)

The Wieferich sequence of 59: (this sequence needs more terms to be periodic)

59, 2777, 133287067, 13, 863, 7, 5, 20771, 18043, 5, ... it also gets 5.

However, there are many values of a(1) with unknown status. For example, the Wieferich sequence of 3:

3, 11, 71, 47, ? (There are no known Wieferich primes in base 47).

The Wieferich sequence of 14:

14, 29, ? (There are no known Wieferich primes in base 29 except 2, but 22 = 4 divides 29 - 1 = 28)

The Wieferich sequence of 39:
39, 8039, 617, 101, 1050139, 29, ? (It also gets 29)

It is unknown that values for k exist such that the Wieferich sequence of k does not become periodic. Eventually, it is unknown that values for k exist such that the Wieferich sequence of k is finite.

When a(n - 1)=k, a(n) will be (start with k = 2): 1093, 11, 1093, 20771, 66161, 5, 1093, 11, 487, 71, 2693, 863, 29, 29131, 1093, 46021, 5, 7, 281, ?, 13, 13, 25633, 20771, 71, 11, 19, ?, 7, 7, 5, 233, 46145917691, 1613, 66161, 77867, 17, 8039, 11, 29, 23, 5, 229, 1283, 829, ?, 257, 491531, ?, ... (For k = 21, 29, 47, 50, even the next value is unknown)

See also 

 Wieferich prime
 Fermat quotient

References

Further reading
 
 
 

Prime numbers